Goenka can refer to:

 B K Goenka, Vice Chairman and Managing Director of Welspun Group
 Ramnath Goenka (1904–1991), freedom fighter and owner of The Indian Express daily
 Shyam Sunder Goeka (1932-2002), Indian entrepreneur, founder of Tally Solutions
 S. N. Goenka (1924-2013), prominent teacher of Vipassana meditation
 RPG Group, the Goenka industrial family of India
 RPSG Group, the spin off Goenka industry family of India
 Badridas Goenka, patriarch of the Goenka industrial family
 Keshav Prasad Goenka, Son of BD Goenka
 Rama Prasad Goenka, Son of KP Goenka
 Harsh Goenka, Son of RP Goenka, patron of RPG
 Sanjiv Goenka, Son of RP Goenka, patron of RPSG

Indian surnames